Sim Sang-ok (born 16 September 1933) is a South Korean middle-distance runner. He competed in the men's 800 metres at the 1956 Summer Olympics.

References

1933 births
Living people
Athletes (track and field) at the 1956 Summer Olympics
South Korean male middle-distance runners
Olympic athletes of South Korea
Place of birth missing (living people)
Asian Games medalists in athletics (track and field)
Asian Games bronze medalists for South Korea
Athletes (track and field) at the 1958 Asian Games
Medalists at the 1958 Asian Games